Dendropsophus nahdereri is a species of frog in the family Hylidae.
It is endemic to Brazil.
Its natural habitats are subtropical or tropical moist lowland forests, freshwater marshes, intermittent freshwater marshes, rural gardens, heavily degraded former forest, ponds, and aquaculture ponds.

References

nahdereri
Endemic fauna of Brazil
Amphibians described in 1963
Taxonomy articles created by Polbot